De Verrekijker is a tower mill in Bergharen, Gelderland, Netherlands which was built in 1904 and has been converted to a holiday cottage. The mill is listed as a Rijksmonument.

History
There was a post mill on this site in 1313, when it was sold to the Cistercians of Alten Camp, near Xanten (now in North Rhine-Westphalia, Germany). A post mill was struck by lightning and destroyed on 31 December 1486. It was replaced by a new mill. The mill immediately preceding the current mill was a post mill that was struck by lightning in 1903 and destroyed, but not by fire; the damage done rendered the mill beyond repair.

De Verrekijker was built in 1904 by millwright Willem Coppes of Bergharen. In 1962, the mill was stripped of its machinery and converted to a holiday cottage. The mill can turn in the wind. It is listed as a Rijksmonument, № 9303.

Description

De Verrekijker is what the Dutch call a "Beltmolen". It is a three storey tower mill built on a mound. The cap is covered n dakleer. Winding is by tailpole and winch. They are carried on a cast iron windshaft which was cast by Merckx in 1897. The windshaft also carries the brake wheel, which has 86 cogs. No other machinery remains.

References

Windmills in Gelderland
Windmills completed in 1904
Tower mills in the Netherlands
Grinding mills in the Netherlands
Agricultural buildings in the Netherlands
Rijksmonuments in Gelderland